Senator Billings may refer to:

Charles L. Billings (1856–1938), Illinois State Senate
Henry M. Billings (1806–1862), Wisconsin State Senate
Noyes Billings (1800–1865), Connecticut State Senate